Mount Airy is an unincorporated community in northeastern Pittsylvania County, Virginia, United States.  Its altitude is 643 feet (196 m), and it is located at  (36.9429172, -79.1922420), along State Route 40 between Gretna and Brookneal. It is included in the Danville, Virginia Metropolitan Statistical Area.

References

Unincorporated communities in Virginia
Unincorporated communities in Pittsylvania County, Virginia
Danville, Virginia micropolitan area